Beatrice Lundmark (born 26 April 1980) is a Swiss high jumper. Her personal bests are 1.92 metres outdoors and 1.88 metres indoors.

International competitions

References

1980 births
Living people
Swiss female high jumpers
Competitors at the 2005 Summer Universiade
Competitors at the 2007 Summer Universiade